Kasf (also Romanized as Kāsf) is a village in Kuhpayeh Rural District Rural District, in the Central District of Bardaskan County, Razavi Khorasan Province, Iran. At the 2006 census, its population was 962, in 231 families.

References 

Populated places in Bardaskan County